Patge Gregori (in English "Page Gregory") is, in Catalan tradition, the most powerful page to the Three Magi or Three Kings who bring gifts to the children on the eve of the Feast of the Epiphany (the night of 5/6 January). He has wide open eyes (the Catalan expression for this, ulls com taronges, literally means "eyes like oranges"), and ears that can hear everything for miles around. He knows who has been good or bad, and lets the Kings know whether to bring gifts (for the good children) or a lump of coal (for the bad ones).

Locally, there are other pages that do the same work.

Catalan mythology
Catalan words and phrases

References